San Antonio Dam is an embankment flood control and debris dam on San Antonio Creek in San Bernardino County, California, about  north of Ontario. The dam was authorized by the Flood Control Acts of 1936 and 1938 as part of a major program to provide flood protection in the Santa Ana River system. Construction began in April 1952 and finished in May 1956.

The dam was built by the Los Angeles District of the U.S. Army Corps of Engineers. The main embankment contains  of material. A concrete overflow spillway on the west side prevents overtopping and drains to the San Antonio and Chino Creek channels, which were lined with concrete between 1956 and 1960 to protect against such an event.

A project has been underway since 2012 to remediate seepage problems at the toe of the dam during heavy rainstorms. The dam is considered a high hazard structure.

See also
List of dams and reservoirs in California

References

Dams in California